The Ypsilanti Water Tower is a historic water tower in Ypsilanti, Michigan, United States.

The tower was designed by William R. Coats and built as part of an elaborate city waterworks project that began in 1889. Located on the highest point in Ypsilanti, the tower was built in 1890 at a cost of $21,435.63. Today the tower is frequently joked about for its phallic shape. It has become a well-known landmark in Ypsilanti, and due to the building's shape and location, the tower is frequently used by residents as a point for providing directions for visitors and residents.

History
An ordinance passed on April 14, 1898, established a yearly rate schedule for residences with running water. Rates were based on the number of faucets in use, the type of business that customers operated and the livestock they owned. A residence with one tap was charged $5.00 and a private bathtub cost an additional $2.00. Saloon keepers paid $7.00 for one faucet, $3.00 for each additional faucet and $1.00 for each billiard table. Each cow a person owned cost $1.00. People who failed to pay their bill were subject to a $50.00 fine and 90 days in the county jail.

During the construction, hoping to protect themselves from injury, the builders made at least four crosses in the stonework, one over the west door, an elaborate but difficult to find Greek Cross on the east side and two inside the water tower. It was completed on February 3, 1890, at the cost of $21,368.

The structure was the only water tower in the Ypsilanti water system until 1956. The Ypsilanti Community Utilities Authority began operating and maintaining the structure in 1974. That same year the tower was designated by the American Water Works Association as an American Water Landmark. It was also designated a Historic Civil Engineering Landmark by the Michigan Section of the American Society of Civil Engineers. In 1976 it was restored.

Structure
The exterior was designed in the popular Queen Anne style of the period. Queen Anne design was less formal than other popular styles at the time; instead it experimented with different shapes particularly towers. Queen Anne buildings also often had more decoration than this structure.

The stone tower is located at the highest point of elevation of the city on Summit Street. The tower is made of Joliet limestone. The reservoir holds a  steel tank. When it was constructed it had a dual purpose. Not only did it store water but the falling water also generated electricity for the city street lamps at night.

A marble bust of Demetrius Ypsilanti stands between a Greek and a U.S. flag at the base of the water tower. The city of Ypsilanti is named after this hero of Greek independence.

Present day
The tower has long been a source of humor for comedians in the Ann Arbor–Ypsilanti area, for its decidedly phallic shape—for which it has been nicknamed "the Brick Dick". (A long-standing urban legend holds that the tower will crumble if a virgin ever graduates from nearby Eastern Michigan University. This is similar to other legends surrounding various landmarks worldwide.) In 2003 Cabinet magazine ranked the tower as the World's Most Phallic Building.

See also
List of towers
American Water Landmark

References

External links

 

Infrastructure completed in 1890
Towers completed in 1890
Buildings and structures in Ypsilanti, Michigan
Water towers in Michigan
National Register of Historic Places in Washtenaw County, Michigan
Water towers on the National Register of Historic Places in Michigan
Phallic symbols
Michigan State Historic Sites in Washtenaw County, Michigan